Melanoleuca cognata, commonly known as the spring cavalier, is an edible species of agaric fungus. It is found in Europe and North America in forests, meadows, and parks. The species may be difficult to identify without analysis of its microscopic features.

The mushroom is fairly tall for species of its genus. The cap is orange to red-brown and semi-viscid. The gills are a shade of ochre. The odour is mild to sweetish.

References

External links

Agaricales enigmatic taxa
Fungi of Europe
Fungi of North America
Fungi described in 1874
Taxa named by Elias Magnus Fries